Mohamed Chahal is a Lebanese rugby league footballer who represented Lebanon national rugby league team in the 2000 World Cup.

Playing career
Mohamed Chahal is an international Australian-born rugby league footballer who represented Lebanon as a fullback. 
Chahal's form challenged team mate and Canterbury superstar Hazem El Masri for the fullback spot in the 1999 World Cup qualifiers in France, the USA and the World Cup in England and Wales. Chahal played tests for Lebanon between 1998-2006 and the 2003-2004 Rugby League World Sevens tournaments in Sydney, Australia. Chahal returned from a stint in France to a short career at the Canterbury Bulldogs and their feeder Sydney Bulls club in the New South Wales Jim Beam Cup until 2007.

References

Living people
Lebanese rugby league players
Lebanon national rugby league team players
Sydney Bulls players
Rugby league fullbacks
Year of birth missing (living people)
Place of birth missing (living people)
Lebanese expatriate rugby league players
Expatriate rugby league players in Australia
Lebanese expatriate sportspeople in Australia